The Hillsong Global Project is a project by Hillsong Music working with various Hillsong Church campuses around the world, along with international worship ministries to create nine albums in nine different languages—Spanish, Portuguese, Korean, Mandarin, Indonesian, German, French, Swedish and Russian—featuring Hillsong songs.

The albums were released on 18 September 2012. All albums contain "Go" except for Global Project Español, which features "You Deserve" instead, and each album has different track listing.

List of albums

Global Project Deutsch 

Global Project Deutsch is the German-language version recorded with Hillsong Church Konstanz and Düsseldorf.

Global Project Español

Global Project Français 

Global Project Français is the French-language version recorded by Hillsong Church Paris.

Global Project Indonesia 

Global Project Indonesia is the Indonesian-language version recorded with JPCC Worship.

Global Project Português 

Global Project Português is the Brazilian Portuguese version recorded with Diante do Trono released on CanZion Brasil.

Global Project Svenska 

Global Project Svenska is the Swedish-language version recorded by Hillsong Church Stockholm.

Global Project Русский 

Global Project Русский is the Russian-language version recorded by Hillsong Church Kiev.

Global Project 華語 

Global Project 華語 is the Mandarin-language version recorded with New Creation Church Singapore.

Global Project 한국어 

Global Project 한국어 is the Korean-language version recorded by Campus Worship (예수전도단).

Awards and nominations 

The Spanish version of this project was awarded "Spanish Album of the Year" at the Gospel Music Association's Dove Awards of 2013.

References

External links 

 Hillsong Global Project

Hillsong Church
2012 albums
Spanish-language albums
Portuguese-language albums
Diante do Trono albums
Hillsong Music albums